Juraj Jurík (born 20 November 1989) is a Czech-Slovak professional ice hockey right winger who currently playing for HK Dukla Trenčín of the Slovak.

Career
Jurík began his career as an academy player for HC Zlín from 2003 to 2009, during which he had loan spells in the Czech 2. Liga with HK Kroměříž and VHK Vsetín. He then moved to Slovakia and played for HC Slovan Bratislava's U20 academy for one season before joining HK 36 Skalica in 2010.

After three seasons with Skalica, Jurík returned to the Czech 2. Liga in 2013 with LHK Jestřábi Prostějov. A season later, he returned to Skalica before moving to HKM Zvolen on June 17, 2015. During the 2016–17 season, he moved to MsHK Žilina. On July 27, 2018, Jurík joined HC Nové Zámky and was named the team's captain for the 2019–20 season. He signed an extension with the team on March 17, 2020.

Career statistics

Regular season and playoffs

References

External links
 

1989 births
Living people
Sportspeople from Skalica
Slovak ice hockey right wingers
VHK Vsetín players
HK 36 Skalica players
HK 95 Panthers Považská Bystrica players
LHK Jestřábi Prostějov players
HKM Zvolen players
MsHK Žilina players
HC Nové Zámky players
MHk 32 Liptovský Mikuláš players
HK Dukla Trenčín players
Czech ice hockey right wingers